Aj, kolika je Jahorina planina (Oh, how big is Jahora's mountain) is a traditional sevdalinka song from Bosnia and Herzegovina.

It was covered by many singers and bands, including Nada Mamula, Hanka Paldum and Teška industrija.

Lyrics

Nada Mamula version 
Her version is performed with harmonica. It was released on 78 rpm shellac.

Teška industrija version
Their version of this folk song is one of greatest hits from 1970s. The video was filmed on Jahorina.

In popular culture 
TV Sarajevo sketch show Top lista nadrealista named fictional pastry shop after this song.

References

Folk songs
Bosnia and Herzegovina folk music
Year of song unknown
Songwriter unknown